Hypenidium is a genus of tephritid  or fruit flies in the family Tephritidae.

Species
Hypenidium graecum Loew, 1862
Hypenidium roborowskii (Becker, 1908)

References

Tephritinae
Tephritidae genera